George Tattersall (pseud. "Wildrake") (13 June 181716 August 1849) was an English sporting artist and architect.

Born in Hyde Park Corner, London, he was a member of the family which operated the Tattersall's horse market, the son of Richard (III) Tattersall (1785–1859). In 1836 he compiled a guide to The Lakes of England illustrated with forty-three charming line drawings, and he showed skill as an architect by building various stables and kennels, including the Tattersall stud stables at Willesden. His experience in this and similar undertakings led him to publish Sporting Architecture (1841).

In the same year, under the pseudonym "Wildrake," he published Cracks of the Day, describing and illustrating sixty-five racehorses. He also contributed illustrations to the Hunting Reminiscences of Nimrod (Charles J. Apperley), the Book of Sports (1843), and the New Sporting Almanack. He was for a brief period the editor of the Almanack and Sporting Magazine.

Shortly after a visit to the United States he married, in 1837, Helen Pritchard; they had four children. He died of brain fever at his home in Cadogan Place, London and was buried at West Norwood Cemetery.

References

Sources

 

1817 births
1849 deaths
Sports artists
19th-century English painters
English male painters
19th-century English architects
Painters from London
Architects from London
Burials at West Norwood Cemetery
19th-century English male artists